North Carolina Highway 101 (NC 101) is a primary state highway in the U.S. state of North Carolina that serves as a shortcut for U.S. Route 70 (US 70). It links Havelock to Beaufort, bypassing Morehead City. Most of the area along NC 101 is rural with many farms and swamps.

Route description
NC 101 begins at a traffic light along US 70 in Havelock. NC 101 continues east from US 70 along Fontana Boulevard south of the Cherry Point Military Base. As NC 101 continues eastward it passes farms and forest along the routing. NC 101 meets up with the southern terminus of NC 306 south of the Minnesott Beach Ferry. At this point, the highway becomes concurrent with North Carolina Bicycle Route 7. NC 101 continues  to the east before reaching North Harlowe at the edge of the Croatan National Forest. NC 101 then turns south to cross into Carteret County. After three more miles NC 101 enters the town of Harlowe. NC 101 turns eastward and leaves the Croatan National Forest before crossing the Intracoastal Waterway near Core Point.

After crossing the Intracoastal Waterway, NC 101 heads a southeastern direction towards Beaufort. The concurrency with Bike Route 7 ends at Laurel Road south of the Intracoastal Waterway. NC 101 parallels the Intracoastal waterway the rest of the way, passing waterfront neighborhoods on the west side of the road and farms on the east side. As NC 101 enters Beaufort, it passes to the east of Michael J. Smith Field and reaches an intersection with US 70 opened in late January 2018. NC 101 ends at a stop sign with Live Oak Street in Beaufort.

History
NC 101 was an original state highway appearing on a 1922 state map of North Carolina. NC 101 started at former NC 10 south of Havelock. NC 101 then went southeast through the town of Newport, and the communities of Mansfield and Wildwood. NC 101 had its eastern terminus in Morehead City. In 1928 NC 10 and NC 101 swapped routing. When NC 10 and US 70 were extended to Atlantic in 1931, NC 101 was truncated east of Beaufort. The routing has been the same since 1931.

Major intersections

References

External links

NCRoads.com: N.C. 101

101
Transportation in Craven County, North Carolina
Transportation in Carteret County, North Carolina